Kalev may refer to:
 Kalev (mythology), a character from Estonian mythology
 Kalev (given name), an Estonian masculine given name
 Kalev (confectioner), an Estonian sweets company
 BC Kalev, a basketball club based in Tallinn, Estonia
 BC Tallinna Kalev, a basketball club based in Tallinn, Estonia
 KK Kalev, defunct basketball club (1920–2005) based in Tallinn, Estonia
 JK Tallinna Kalev, a football club based in Tallinn, Estonia
 JK Sillamäe Kalev, a football club based in Sillamäe, Estonia
 Tallinna Kalev RFC, a rugby union club based in Tallinn, Estonia
 Kalev Tallinn, a multi-sport club in Tallinn, Estonia
 Kalev-class submarine, class of Estonian British-built submarines and leading ship of this class
 Estonian Sports Association Kalev
 Kaliv (Hasidic dynasty), the Chassidic dynasty and Rebbes of Kaliv/Kalev/Kalov 
 Caleb (given name), a Biblical name, originally rendered in Hebrew as Calev
 Kalev (band), a British rock band